Shree Nagar may refer to:

Shree Nagar, Humla, Nepal
Shree Nagar, Mugu, Nepal